A log profile, or logarithmic profile, is a shooting profile, or gamma curve, found on some digital video cameras that gives a wide dynamic and tonal range, allowing more latitude to apply colour and style choices. The resulting image appears washed out, requiring color grading in post-production, but retains shadow and highlight detail that would otherwise be lost if a regular linear profile had been used that clipped shadow and highlight detail. The feature is mostly used in filmmaking and videography.

Proprietary log profiles on various cameras
C-Log or Canon Log on Canon cameras (including C-Log2 and C-Log3)
D-Log on DJI UAV cameras
F-Log on Fujifilm cameras
N-Log on Nikon cameras
S-Log on Sony cameras (including S-Log2 and S-Log3)
V-Log on Panasonic cameras (including Panasonic, Panavision and Lumix cameras).

See also
Hybrid log–gamma
Raw image format
Rec. 709

References

External links
"A quick look at Log Gamma with DPReview.com" – video demonstrates reasons for using a log profile

Film and video terminology